The following are the records of Honduras in Olympic weightlifting. Records are maintained in each weight class for the snatch lift, clean and jerk lift, and the total for both lifts by the Honduras Weightlifting National Federation.

Men

Women

References

Honduras
Olympic weightlifting
weightlifting